Archie H. Miller (June 8, 1886 – February 11, 1958) was the 32nd Lieutenant Governor of Minnesota.

Miller was born in Hopkins, Minnesota. He served as a state senator from 1931 to 1943, and became Lieutenant Governor after Edward John Thye resigned to become Governor. He served from May 6, 1943, to January 2, 1945.

After leaving office, he returned to the Senate, becoming majority leader in 1949, following the death of Charlie Orr in a car crash. Miller served in that position until his death in 1958.

References

External links
Minnesota Historical Society
Minnesota Legislators Past and Present

1886 births
1958 deaths
Lieutenant Governors of Minnesota
Republican Party Minnesota state senators
20th-century American politicians